Fitore Govori (born 3 August 1987) is a Kosovan footballer who plays as a defender. She was a member of the Albania women's national team before Kosovo being accepted as a member of UEFA and FIFA. After that, she has played for Kosovo.

See also
List of Kosovo women's international footballers
List of Albania women's international footballers

References

1987 births
Living people
Sportspeople from Pristina
Kosovan women's footballers
Women's association football defenders
Kosovo women's international footballers
Kosovan people of Albanian descent
Sportspeople of Albanian descent
Albanian women's footballers
KFF Vllaznia Shkodër players
Albania women's international footballers
Dual internationalists (women's football)